Conolly is a surname. Notable people with the surname include:

Arthur Conolly (1807–1842), British intelligence officer, explorer and writer
Claud Conolly Cowan or Claude Dampier (1879–1955), British film actor
Conolly Abel Smith CB GCVO JP (1899–1985), Vice Admiral in the British Royal Navy who served during World War I and World War II
Conolly Gage (1905–1984), British politician and judge
Conolly Norman (1853–1908), Irish alienist, or psychiatrist
David Conolly, writer, director, comedian and actor
Edward Michael Conolly (1786–1849), Irish Member of Parliament
Edward Tennyson Conolly (1822–1908), New Zealand lawyer, politician and judge
Islay Conolly (1923–2022), Caymanian educator
James Conolly, Canadian anthropologist
John Augustus Conolly, Irish recipient of the Victoria Cross
John Conolly (1794–1866), English psychiatrist
Kevin Conolly MP, an Australian politician, is a member of the New South Wales Legislative Assembly
Lady Louisa Conolly (1743–1821), the third of the four Lennox Sisters in Stella Tillyard's book Aristocrats
Patricia Conolly (born 1933), Australian stage actress
Richard L. Conolly (1892–1962), United States Navy Admiral, who served during World War I and World War II
Sarah Conolly (Emmerdale) or Sarah Sugden (née Connolly), fictional character in the British ITV soap opera, Emmerdale
Thomas Conolly (1738–1803) (1738–1803), Irish landowner
William Conolly (1662–1729), Irish politician, Commissioner of Revenue, lawyer and landowner
William Conolly-Carew, 6th Baron Carew CBE C.St.J (1905–1994), Aide-de-Camp to the Governor of Bermuda, Sir Thomas Astley-Cubbitt 1931–1936
William James Conolly (died 1754), Irish politician
William Warren Conolly, OBE, JP (1920–2008), politician and Attorney in the Cayman Islands

See also
USS Conolly (DD-979), Spruance-class destroyer built in Pascagoula, Mississippi
Conley (disambiguation)
Connelly (disambiguation)
Connolly (disambiguation)
Cononley